Jagdish Ishwarbhai Vishwakarma (Panchal) (born 12 August 1973) is currently the Minister of state, Gujarat. In the new Gujarat CM Bhupendra Patel’s cabinet, Jagdish Vishwakarma (Panchal) has been allocated various portfolios. He is an MLA from Nikol constituency in Gujarat for its 14th legislative assembly. He is a state-level minister of Cottage Industries, Co-Operation, Salt Industries, Protocol (Independent Charge), Industries,Road and Building, Forest, Environment And Climate Change, Printing And Stationery (State Minister), Government of Gujarat. He was BJP President of Ahmedabad city and he has served as the Convenor of Udhyog Cell Bharatiya Janata Party Gujarat.

Early life 
Jagdish Vishwakarma was born in Ahmedabad on 12 August 1973 He came from a Gujarati family.

Political Career
 Jagdish Ishwarbhai Vishwakarma began his political journey as a Buth in charge in Thakkarbapanagar in 1998  and was elected as MLA Member of Legislative assembly from Nikol constituency in Gujarat in 2012 Gujarat assembly elections.
 He was the Industry cell convenor in 2013, Bharatiya Janata Party, Gujarat and later on, he served as a President of Karnavati Bjp Ahmedabad city. He serves as minister of state, BJP Gujarat in the Ministry of MSME.
 Jagdish Vishwakarma has been given additional charge of Minister of State, Roads and Building by the Chief Minister of Gujarat Bhupendrabhai Patel on 20th August 2022. 
 A new record was created on 27th August 2022,  while celebrating the 75th anniversary of India's Independence in presence of Prime Minister Narendra Modi, Chief Minister Bhupendrabhai Patel, Home Minister Gujarat State Harsh Sanghavi and Jagdish Vishwakarma as 7,500 women spun `charkha' (spinning wheel) together.
 Jagdish Vishwakarma, a BJP candidate from Nikol constituency is re-elected in the 2022 Gujarat Legislative Assembly election won by 55,198 votes for the 15th Gujarat Assembly. This is the third consecutive win for Jagdish Vishwakarma from Nikol constituency.

News
 Gujarat is witnessing fast growth of Ministry of Micro, Small and Medium Enterprises and startups are also record high mentioned by Industries Minister of Gujarat State Jagdish Vishwakarma at Gujarat University MSME Growth Conclave.

Personal life
Jagdish Vishwakarma is married to Alkaben Panchal.

References

Living people
Bharatiya Janata Party politicians from Gujarat
Gujarat MLAs 2012–2017
1951 births
Gujarat MLAs 2017–2022